Ronald Donato Vitiello (born July 30, 1963) is an American government official and former U.S. Border patrol agent who served as deputy director and acting director of the U.S. Immigration and Customs Enforcement from June 30, 2018 to April 12, 2019. He previously served as acting deputy commissioner of the U.S. Customs and Border Protection from 2017 to 2018 and chief of the United States Border Patrol in 2017.

Career
Vitiello joined the U.S. Border Patrol in 1985 and began service in Laredo, Texas. He has held various leadership positions within the Border Patrol, including supervisory Border patrol agent; assistant patrol agent in charge; special operations Supervisor; chief patrol agent for the Rio Grande Valley, and for the Swanton, Vermont sectors; assistant chief patrol agent; and Senior Associate chief.

Chief of the Border Patrol
In 2010, Vitiello was appointed deputy chief of the Border Patrol, and in 2015-16 he served as acting chief, after which Mark A. Morgan was appointed chief. Vitiello then served as executive assistant commissioner for operations support at U.S. Customs and Border Protection, the Border Patrol's parent agency.

Vitiello was appointed chief of the Border Patrol by President Donald Trump in January 2017 and assumed the position on February 1, 2017, replacing Mark A. Morgan. The National Border Patrol Council, the union which represents Border patrol agents, openly supported Vitiello for the position.

Deputy Commissioner of U.S. Customs and Border Protection
After U.S. Customs and Border Protection deputy commissioner Randolph Alles resigned to become the director of the United States Secret Service, Vitiello was appointed to take his place on April 25, 2017.

Acting Director of U.S. Immigration and Customs Enforcement
In early June 2018, Vitiello was named acting director of U.S. Immigration and Customs Enforcement (ICE) by Secretary of Homeland Security Kirstjen Nielsen. Under Vitiello's leadership, ICE continued implementing a policy of "zero tolerance," which critics charge has had the result of separating families at the border and increasing deportations.

In August 2018, Trump nominated Vitiello to become ICE's permanent director.

During a 2018 Senate confirmation hearing, Senator Gary Peters brought up a 2015 tweet from Vitiello, where he suggested to Mark Levin that the Democratic Party be renamed the "liberalcratic party or the NeoKlanist party". Vitiello said it was intended as a direct message, was a joke, and was sorry it caused offense; Kamala Harris echoed Peters' reply, grilling him on why that was a poor comparison. When Vitiello said the KKK "tried to use fear and force" against "race and ethnicity", Harris asked if Vitiello saw parallels between ICE and the KKK, especially with ICE's enforcement of the Trump administration family separation policy. This led to a strong reaction from Fox News's Trish Regan and a strong letter to Harris from the Federal Law Enforcement Officers Association.

On April 4, 2019, Trump rescinded Vitiello's nomination as director of ICE, stating to reporters the next day at the White House before leaving on a trip to border that, "Ron’s a good man, but we’re going in a tougher direction." On April 10, 2019, Vitiello announced his resignation from ICE.

Personal life and education
Vitiello graduated from Santana High School in 1981. He is married to Nuri and has two children.

References

External links

CBP profile

1963 births
Living people
Place of birth missing (living people)
Grossmont College alumni
United States Border Patrol agents
U.S. Immigration and Customs Enforcement officials
People from Chicago
Trump administration personnel
Obama administration personnel